1ST is the debut studio album by the Japanese idol group SixTones. The album was first released through their record label Sony Music Entertainment Japan on January 6, 2021, in three versions: the Rough Stone edition, the Tone Colors edition (both of which are first press editions), as well as a regular edition. The album topped both the Oricon Albums Chart and Billboard Japan Hot Albums chart, selling over 467,000 copies in Japan in its first week. It has since been certified double platinum by the RIAJ.

Album information
The album's first-press edition was released in two versions: the "Rough Stone Edition" and "Tone Colors Edition", the names of which come from the origin of SixTones' name. The album's lead song "ST" was called an "emotional" and "loud" rock song about people exceeding their own limits. The "Rough Stone edition" includes the studio versions of the group's original five pre-debut songs. For songs on the "Tone Colors edition", the group divided into duo units and recorded three different genre songs. The regular edition includes two additional songs, including a popular coupling song that was included on "Imitation Rain/D.D.", their first single, as well as a remix of the song "Telephone". Beside the lead song, the unit songs also includes a music video.

Songs
1ST includes three of the group's previously released singles: "Imitation Rain", "Navigator", and "New Era".

"Imitation Rain" is the group's first single that also includes a single by Snow Man, another group under Johnny's who debuted the same day as SixTones. The song was composed by Yoshiki. The single sold more than one million copies. "Navigator" was used as the opening theme of anime series The Millionaire Detective Balance: Unlimited. "New Era" was used as the opening theme of anime series Yashahime: Princess Half-Demon.

The album features a mix of rock, hip hop, R&B, pop and EDM. The "rough stone edition" includes 15 songs, including SixTones' original pre-debut songs that were previously performed live.

Track listing

Charts

Certifications

References

External links
Special website 
Product information at Johnny's net 

2021 debut albums
Japanese-language albums
Sony Music Entertainment Japan albums
SixTones albums